The 1935 Australian Race Drivers' Cup was a motor race staged at the Phillip Island circuit in Victoria, Australia on 5 November 1935.		
The race was contested as an "all powers" handicap over a total distance of 116 miles. 
It was the first event to be held on a new and improved 3.312 mile triangular road course which replaced the previous six mile rectangular layout.		

The race, which was organised by the Australian Racing Drivers Club, was won by Les Burrows driving a Terraplane.

Results

Notes
 Entries: 17	
 Number of starters: Unknown
 Number of finishers: Unknown	
 Limit starter: G Bastow			
 Scratch starter: EJ Buckley			
 Fastest lap: L Burrows (Terraplane), 3m 0s, 66.24 mph

References

Race Drivers' Cup
Motorsport at Phillip Island